The Tartan 34-2 is an American sailboat, that was designed by Sparkman & Stephens and first built in 1984.

The Tartan 34-2 is a development of the 1979 Sparkman & Stephens-designed Tartan 33 R, with the stern extended and a different interior layout. It is unrelated to the 1968 Sparkman & Stephens-designed Tartan 34 C. Both the 34-2 and the earlier 34 C were marketed simply as the "Tartan 34", but to avoid confusion they are commonly referred to as the 34 C ("Classic") and the 34-2 to differentiate the designs.

Production
The Tartan 34-2 was built by Tartan Marine in the United States between 1984 and 1989, with 110 examples completed.

Design

The Tartan 34-2 is a small recreational keelboat, built predominantly of fiberglass, with wood trim. It has a masthead sloop rig, an internally-mounted spade-type rudder, a reverse transom and a fixed fin keel. It displaces  and carries  of ballast.

The boat has a PHRF racing average handicap of 177 with a high of 186 and low of 174. The shoal draft version has an average PHRF handicap of 141 with a high of 147 and low of 135.

See also
List of sailing boat types

Similar sailboats
Beneteau 331
Beneteau First Class 10
C&C 34
C&C 34/36
Catalina 34
Coast 34
Columbia 34
Columbia 34 Mark II
Creekmore 34
Crown 34
CS 34
Express 34
Hunter 34
San Juan 34
S&S 34
Sea Sprite 34
Sun Odyssey 349
UFO 34
Viking 34

References

External links

Keelboats
1980s sailboat type designs
Sailing yachts
Sailboat type designs by Sparkman and Stephens
Sailboat types built by Tartan Marine